In complex analysis,  a Schwarz–Christoffel mapping is a conformal map of the  upper half-plane or the complex unit disk onto the interior of a simple polygon. Such a map is guaranteed to exist by the Riemann mapping theorem (stated by Bernhard Riemann in 1851); the Schwarz–Christoffel formula provides an explicit construction. They were introduced independently by Elwin Christoffel in 1867 and  Hermann Schwarz in 1869.

Schwarz–Christoffel mappings are used in potential theory and some of its applications, including minimal surfaces, hyperbolic art, and fluid dynamics.

Definition 
Consider a polygon in the complex plane. The Riemann mapping theorem implies that there is a biholomorphic mapping f from the upper half-plane

to the  interior of the polygon.  The function f maps the real axis to the edges of the polygon. If the polygon has interior angles , then this mapping is given by 

A transformation of this form is called a Schwarz–Christoffel mapping.

The integral can be simplified by mapping the point at infinity of the  plane to one of the vertices of the  plane polygon. By doing this, the first factor in the formula becomes constant and so can be absorbed into the constant . Conventionally, the point at infinity would be mapped to the vertex with angle .

In practice, to find a mapping to a specific polygon one needs to find the  values which generate the correct polygon side lengths. This requires solving a set of nonlinear equations, and in most cases can only be done numerically.

Example

Consider a semi-infinite strip in the  plane. Then  is given by

Evaluation of this integral yields

  

where  is a (complex) constant of integration. Hence the Schwarz–Christoffel mapping is given by

 

This transformation is sketched below.

Other simple mappings

Triangle

which can be expressed in terms of hypergeometric functions.

Square
The upper half-plane is mapped to the square by

where F is the incomplete elliptic integral of the first kind.

General triangle
The upper half-plane is mapped to a triangle with circular arcs for edges by the Schwarz triangle map.

See also
 The Schwarzian derivative appears in the theory of Schwarz–Christoffel mappings.

References

 
 
 
  §§267–270, pp. 665–677.
 
 The Conformal Hyperbolic Square and Its Ilk Chamberlain Fong, Bridges Finland Conference Proceedings, 2016

Further reading
An analogue of SC mapping that works also for multiply-connected is presented in: .

External links
 
 Schwarz–Christoffel toolbox (software for MATLAB)

Conformal mappings